DR Chamaeleontis (DR Cha), also known as HD 93237, is a star located in the southern circumpolar constellation Chamaeleon. The system has an average apparent magnitude of 5.97, allowing it to be faintly visible to the naked eye.

The visible component has been given several spectral classes over the years. It has been given a luminosity class of a giant star (III), a subgiant (IV),  a dwarf star (V), and emission lines. Most sources generally agree that DR Cha is a B5 star. It has 6 times the mass of the Sun and 6.48 times its girth.

In 1982, M. Jaschek listed DR Cha in a catalog of Be stars. It has been classified as an Algol-type eclipsing binary, having a period of 19.4436 days. However in 2022, Labadie-Bartz et al. examined the TESS data for this star, and found that the primary and secondary eclipses are separated by "about 20 days", which suggests that the 19.4436 day period published earlier may represent the time interval between primary and secondary eclipse, rather than the full orbital period.

References

Chamaeleontis, DR
Algol variables
B-type subgiants
B-type main-sequence stars
Chamaeleon (constellation)
093237
52340
4206
CD-79 00439
Chamaeleontis, 24
B-type giants